The following is a list of notable people who were born, or who have lived a significant portion of their lives in Dallas, Texas.

A
Vinnie Paul Abbott, musician
Amy Acker, actress
Jensen Ackles, actor
Mike Agnew, soccer player
Jeff Agoos (born 1968), Swiss-born American soccer defender
Troy Aikman, NFL player and sportscaster
LaMarcus Aldridge, basketball player
Bruce Alger, former U.S. Representative for Texas's 5th congressional district
Abby Anderson, country singer 
AnonymousCulture, rapper
Heather Armbrust, IFBB professional bodybuilder
Darrell Arthur, basketball player
Aaron Aryanpur, stand-up comedian
Karan Ashley, American actor known for her role as Aisha in Mighty Morphin Power Rangers
Tex Avery, cartoonist
Avion Roe (formed in 2011), post-hardcore band from Dallas

B
Harry Babasin, musician
Erykah Badu, singer
Jerry Bailey, Hall of Fame jockey
Troy Baker, singer, musician, voice actor
Ernie Banks, Hall of Fame baseball player
Sebastian Barrie, football player
Clyde Barrow, outlaw (Bonnie and Clyde)
Steve Bartlett, Dallas mayor, U.S. Representative
John Battaglia, Child killer executed by lethal injection 
Tony Battie, basketball player
Lou Singletary Bedford (1837–?), author, poet, editor
Bedhead, indie-rock band
Yella Beezy, rapper
Robby Benson, actor
 Drew Binsky, vlogger
Charlie Blackmon, baseball player for the Colorado Rockies
Elton Bomer, politician
Tommy Bond, actor (Butch from Our Gang)
Chris Bosh, basketball player
Craig Wayne Boyd, Nashville-based country music singer-songwriter, musician, and winner of The Voice season 7 (raised in the Dallas suburb of Mesquite)
Charlie Brackins, football player
Doyle Bramhall II, guitarist, singer and composer
Drew Brees, football player
Edie Brickell, singer
Rex Brown, musician
Tim Brown, Hall of Fame football player
Freddie Bruno, Christian rapper
John Neely Bryan, founder of Dallas 
David Burns, basketball player
George W. Bush, former Texas Governor and 43rd President of the United States 
Laura Bush, former First Lady of the United States

C
K Callan, actress
Henry Calvin, actor (Sergeant Garcia on Disney's Zorro) 
Tevin Campbell, singer
Gina Carano, Muay Thai and MMA fighter, actress
Jason Castro, singer
Annie Clark, musician
Ramsey Clark, U.S. Attorney General
Tom C. Clark, U.S. Supreme Court justice
Kelly Clarkson, singer and songwriter
Bill Clements, Texas Governor and businessman
John Congleton, music producer
Kerry Cooks, football coach
Pat Corley, actor (Murphy Brown)
Rafael Cruz, Christian preacher and public speaker; father of Texas Senator Ted Cruz
Mark Cuban, businessman, entrepreneur and owner of the Dallas Mavericks

D
George Dahl, architect
Vernon Dalhart, singer
Bebe Daniels, early film star
Darrion Daniels, defensive tackle for the Atlanta Falcons
Bettye Danoff, golfer, LPGA co-founder
Linda Darnell, actress
Sahara Davenport, drag queen
Storm Davis, née George Earl "Storm" Davis, MLB baseball player
George Dealey, businessman
Samuel David Dealey, World War II Congressional Medal of Honor recipient
Tim DeLaughter (from The Polyphonic Spree)
Dimebag Darrell (Darrell Abbott), guitarist and songwriter
DJ Hurricane, hip hop disc jockey and producer
The D.O.C., rapper
Asian Doll, rapper
Dorrough, rapper
Dave Duncan, MLB baseball player and coach
Jeff Dunham, ventriloquist
Pat Durham, basketball player
Charlie Van Dyke, former radio disc jockey, frequent guest host of American Top 40 from 1983 to 1988

E
 Seth Elledge, baseball player
 Andre Emmett, basketball player
 Jane Johnson Endsley (1848–1933), ran one of the city's largest rail-yard coal and log businesses
 Emily Erwin, musician (Dixie Chicks)
 Martie Erwin, musician (Dixie Chicks)
 Forest Etheredge (1929–2004), Illinois state senator and educator
 Anthony Evans (born 1978), Christian singer and songwriter; son of Tony Evans

F
 Morgan Fairchild, actress
 Terry Fator, ventriloquist
 Dean Fearing, chef
 Fila Fresh Crew, rap group
 Miles Fisher, actor

G
Randy Galloway, sports journalist
Kyle Gann, music critic
Red Garland, jazz pianist
Lane Garrison, actor
Melinda Gates, philanthropist, ex-wife of Bill Gates
Lester Gatewood, football player
Don Gililland, guitarist
Peri Gilpin, actress (Frasier)
Selena Gomez, singer
Omar Gonzalez, soccer player
YaYa Gosselin, actress
W.V. Grant, televangelist 
A. J. Green, NFL Player
Cecil Green (1919–1951), race car driver
AJ Griffin, NBA player for the Atlanta Hawks
Frank Shelby Groner (1873–1943), executive secretary of the Baptist General Convention of Texas, 1918–1928

H
Jenna Bush Hager,  journalist
Joe Hahn, American musician, DJ, director and visual artist for nu-metal band Linkin Park
Elizabeth Forsythe Hailey, writer
Jack Halliday, football player*William Jackson Harper, comedian actor
Chris Harrison, host (The Bachelor, Designers' Challenge)
Will Ford Hartnett, Dallas attorney and state representative, 1991 to 2013
Brad Hawkins, actor (Ryan Steele on VR Troopers)
Gibby Haynes, singer/musician with Butthole Surfers
Jerry Haynes, children's TV show host (Mr. Peppermint, Peppermint Place)
Josh Henderson, actor (John Ross from Dallas)
Nekeshia Henderson, basketball player
Don Henley, musician
Grant Hill, Hall of Fame basketball player and Vice Chair of the Board for the Atlanta Hawks
Barron Hilton, retired CEO of Hilton Hotels; co-founder of American Football League; grandfather of Paris Hilton
Conrad Hilton, Jr., hotel heir; airline director; first husband of Elizabeth Taylor
Dustin Hodge, producer and writer
Terri Hoffman, religious cult leader
"Doc" Holliday, western gunfighter, gambler, and dentist; lived in Dallas in the 1870s
Steve Holy, country singer
Jaden Hossler, TikTok personality and singer
Tina Huang, actress (Rizzoli & Isles)
Ray Wylie Hubbard, musician
Michael Huffington, politician, activist, ex-husband of Arianna Huffington
Sarah T. Hughes, judge
Prince Albert Hunt, musician
Ryan Hunter-Reay, Indy car driver
Paige Hurd, actress, Tasha from Everybody Hates Chris
Willie Hutch, singer
Kay Bailey Hutchison, United States Permanent Representative to NATO, former U.S. Senator from Texas
Emerson Hyndman, soccer player for Atlanta United

I
Vanilla Ice, rapper

J
Bishop T.D. Jakes, pastor, Senior Pastor of The Potters House
Blind Lemon Jefferson, musician
Eric Johnson, mayor of Dallas 
Michael Johnson, athlete, Olympic gold medalist
Nick Jonas, singer
Alex Jones, conservative radio host
Caleb Landry Jones, actor
Jalen Jones (born 1993), basketball player for Hapoel Haifa in the Israeli Basketball Premier League
Lindsay Jones, gamer, actor
Margo Jones, stage director and producer
Norah Jones, singer
Ron Jones, football player
J. Erik Jonsson, co-founder of Texas Instruments; politician

K
Christian Kane, actor
Bavand Karim, film and TV producer
Ty Kelly (born 1988), American-Israeli MLB player (New York Mets)
Clayton Kershaw, MLB pitcher (Los Angeles Dodgers)
Jack Kilby, co-inventor of the integrated circuit, Nobel Prize in Physics laureate
Kim Chung-ha, previous member of South Korean girl group I.O.I; lived in Dallas for eight years before returning to South Korea
Don King, football player
Freddie King, musician
Ron Kirk, politician
Madison Kocian, gymnast at the 2016 Summer Olympics 
Linda Koop, Republican member of Texas House of Representatives
Kelvin Korver, football player
Kankan, rapper

L
Tom Landry, legendary Dallas Cowboys coach
James Lankford, U.S. Senator from Oklahoma
Alonzo Lawrence, football player
Bobby Layne, football player
Logan Leistikow, filmmaker
Turney W. Leonard, World War II Congressional Medal of Honor recipient 
Gus Levene, composer, arranger, orchestrator, guitarist
Jaren Lewison, actor
Lil Twist, rapper
Lil' Wil, rapper
Bob Lilly, football player
Maggie Lindemann, musician 
Nastia Liukin, gymnast
Lil Loaded, rapper
Albert Louis "Al" Lipscomb, politician, civil rights icon
Lisa Loeb, singer
Trini Lopez, singer
Demi Lovato, singer, songwriter and actress (born in Albuquerque)
Big Lurch, rapper

M
Peter MacNicol, actor
Jayne Mansfield, actress, graduate of Dallas' Highland Park High School
Stephanie March, actress  (Law and Order: Special Victims Unit, Conviction)
Minnie Lichtenstein Marcus, co-founder of Neiman Marcus
Stanley Marcus, chairman of Neiman Marcus
Mark Matlock, minister
MC 900 Ft. Jesus, a.k.a., Mark Griffin, musician
Randy McAllister, blues musician
George McFarland, actor (Spanky on Our Gang)
Phil McGraw, doctor and television personality (Dr. Phil)
Kevin McHale, actor
Judith McNaught, novelist
Meat Loaf, née Marvin Lee Aday, musician
Leighton Meester, actress (Fort Worth)
Fred Meyer, chairman of Texas Republican Party, 1988–1984; president of Tyler Corporation, 1983–1986
Morgan Meyer, state representative (University Park)
Bunny Michael, visual artist, musician, and rapper
C.J. Miles, NBA player
Julie Miller, singer
Rhett Miller, musician
Steve Miller, musician
Elizabeth Mitchell, actress (Lost)
Kiko Mizuhara, singer and actress
Mike Modano, hockey player
Whistlin' Alex Moore, musician
Belita Moreno, actress 
Keith Moreland, baseball player
Glenn Morshower, actor
Kyle Muller, starting pitcher for the Atlanta Braves
Chaz Mulkey, kickboxer
Michael Martin Murphey, singer ("Wildfire")
Mason Musso, singer
Mitchel Musso, actor

N
Terence Nance, actor, filmmaker, and director 
Le'Bryan Nash (born 1992), basketball player in the Israeli Basketball Premier League
Tracey Needham, actress
Michael Nesmith, musician, songwriter (The Monkees)

O
Igor Olshansky (born 1982), National Football League player
Hayley Orrantia, actress, country music singer/songwriter
Lee Harvey Oswald, accused assassin of President John F. Kennedy

P
 Hot Lips Page, musician
Kevin Page, artist and actor
Bonnie Parker, outlaw (Bonnie and Clyde)
Corey Pavin (born 1959), professional golfer
Piper Perabo, actress
Rudy Pena, American professional soccer player
H. Ross Perot, businessman, presidential candidate
Ben J. Pierce, YouTuber, singer-songwriter, and actor
Art Powell, football player
 Ryan Pressly, Major League Baseball pitcher and All-Star

R
Steve Railsback, actor
Willis Alan Ramsey, musician
Jon Randall, country singer 
Julius Randle, NBA player
John T. Richardson, priest and President of DePaul University
LeAnn Rimes, singer (raised in Garland, a suburb of Dallas)
Emily Robison, country singer from Dixie Chicks
Holland Roden, actress
Dennis Rodman, NBA player
Kyle Rote, Jr., soccer player and coach
Scott Rothkopf, art curator
Jack Rutter, singer better known as Ritt Momney
Debby Ryan, actress, singer

S
Mark Salling, actor
Stark Sands, actor
Sam the Sham, musician
Deion Sanders, former football player
Boz Scaggs, musician
Jim Sharp, former justice of the First Texas Court of Appeals in Houston; Dallas native
She-Dick, electropop band formed in Dallas
Megan Shipman, voice actress
Alana Shipp, American/Israeli IFBB professional bodybuilder
 Jason Siggers (born 1985), basketball player in the Israel Basketball Premier League
 Matthew Silverman (born 1976), General Manager and President for Baseball Operations for the Tampa Bay Rays
Ashlee Simpson, singer (raised in Richardson, a suburb of Dallas) 
Jessica Simpson, singer (raised in Richardson with her sister Ashlee) 
A. Maceo Smith, civil rights activist
Buster Smith, musician
Elliott Smith, singer
Dan Smoot, journalist, author, radio-TV commentator, long-term Dallas resident
Gary Spann, football player
Aaron Spelling, television producer (Charlie's Angels, The Love Boat)
Errol Spence Jr., unified boxing welterweight world champion 
Jordan Spieth, golfer
Matthew Stafford, NFL player
Roger Staubach, NFL player
Sydnee Steele, pornographic actress 
B.W. Stevenson, musician
Stephen Stills, musician
Sly Stone, singer
Troy Stoudermire, football player
Terry Southern, writer 
Nikki Stringfield, guitarist (The Iron Maidens and Before the Mourning)
Max Swarner, singer, actor
Erwin Swiney, football player
Noah Syndergaard, MLB pitcher (New York Mets)

T
Sharon Tate, actress
Travis Tedford, Spanky, The Little Rascals
 Elijah Thomas (born 1996), basketball player for Bnei Herzliya in the Israeli Basketball Premier League
Robert L. Thornton, businessman and politician
Jim Thurman, comedy writer
Nick Thurman, NFL football player for the Atlanta Falcons
Neal Tiemann, musician
Stephen Tobolowsky, actor
John Tower, politician
Lee Trevino, golfer
Cowboy Troy, country rapper 
Jerrold B. Tunnell, mathematician
Wylie Turner, football player
Lil Twist, rapper

U
Usher, singer, entertainer
Kamaru Usman, MMA fighter in the UFC

V
Vanilla Ice, rapper
Jimmie Vaughan, musician
Stevie Ray Vaughan, musician
Victor L. Vescovo, explorer
Lacey Von Erich, wrestler

W
Caroline Wagner, Residents' Interhall Congress Graduate Assistant for Student Leadership at the University of Arkansas, cousin of University of Arkansas Razorbacks football offensive tackle Dalton Wagner
Doak Walker, football player
Malcolm Walker, football player
T-Bone Walker, musician
Ken Weaver, auto racer
Kennedy Ashlyn Wenning, musician known as SRSQ
J. White Did It, record producer
Donnie Williams, football player
Victor Willis, lead singer of Village People
Travis Willingham, voice actor
Luke Wilson, actor
Mark Wilson, magician
Owen Wilson, actor
Ron Woodroof, "Dallas Buyers Club" founder
 Bracey Wright, basketball player, guard for the Minnesota Timberwolves, Israeli Basketball Premier League
Robin Wright Penn, actress
Angus G. Wynne, real estate developer and founder of Six Flags theme parks

Y
Chris Young, MLB pitcher

See also
List of people from Texas

References

Dallas

People from Dallas
Dallas